Afghanistan is a landlocked country located within South Asia and Central Asia.

Afghanistan is a developing country, it is no longer one of the world's poorest country, however there was decades of war and lack of foreign investment. , the nation's GDP stands at about $60.58 billion with an exchange rate of $20.31 billion, and the GDP per capita is $1,900. The country's exports totaled $2.7 billion in 2012. Its unemployment rate was reported in 2008 at about 35%. According to a 2009 report, about 42% of the population lives on less than $1 a day. The nation has less than $1.5 billion in external debt.

The Afghan economy has been growing at about 10% per year in the last decade, which is due to the infusion of over $50 billion in international aid and remittances from Afghan expats. It is also due to improvements made to the transportation system and agricultural production, which is the backbone of the nation's economy.

Notable firms 
This list includes notable companies with primary headquarters located in the country. The industry and sector follow the Industry Classification Benchmark taxonomy. Organizations which have ceased operations are included and noted as defunct.

See also 
 Economy of Afghanistan
 List of television channels in Afghanistan

References

External links 
 Capitalism Comes to Afghanistan Time Magazine Monday, Dec. 04, 2006

Afghanistan